The 2002–03 Ranji Trophy was the 69th season of the Ranji Trophy. Mumbai defeated Tamil Nadu by 141 runs in the final.

Format

The major change in the format of the tournament was the introduction of the Elite and Plate divisions. The 15 teams which qualified from the Zonal league in the previous season were placed in two groups in the upper Elite division. The top two teams from each group qualified for the semifinal and then played for the Ranji title. The remaining twelve teams played each other in two groups in the Plate division. They played the Plate semifinal and the final. The finalists qualified for the Elite division in the next year while the two lowest placed teams in the Elite division were demoted.

Karnataka and Kerala were promoted to the Elite division for 2003–04. This meant that five of the six South Zone teams played in the Elite division. Himachal Pradesh and Orissa were demoted to the Plate.

Scorecards and averages
Cricketarchive

Group Matches

Elite Group
Group A

  Mumbai and Delhi qualified for the Elite Group knockout stage.

Group B

  Tamil Nadu and Baroda qualified for the Elite Group knockout stage.
 Baroda qualified to the knockouts ahead of Punjab on a better run-quotient.

Plate Group
Group A

  Kerala and Vidarbha qualified for the Plate Group knockout stage.

Group B

  Karnataka and Madhya Pradesh qualified for the Elite Group knockout stage.

Knockout Matches

Plate Semifinal 1

Plate Semifinal 2

Plate Final

Elite Semifinal 1

Elite Semifinal 2

Final

References

External links

Ranji Trophy
Ranji Trophy seasons
Ranji Trophy